Townsend is a city in and the county seat of Broadwater County, Montana, United States. The population was 1,787 at the 2020 census.

History
Lewis and Clark passed through on the voyage of discovery in 1805, although the first white settlers, homesteaders and Civil War veterans in search of gold, did not arrive until the late 1860s.   In 1883, a railstop was established as businesses became established supporting gold mining in the region.  Townsend was named by railroad officials, in honor of Susan Townsend, the wife of Charles Barstow Wright, president of the Northern Pacific (1875–1879).

Geography
Townsend is located at  (46.320218, -111.517642). and is situated at approximately 3800 feet above sea level. Townsend is located approximately 35 miles from Helena, the state capital and 35 miles from the convergence of the Jefferson, Madison, and Gallatin rivers which form the headwaters of the Missouri River. Nicknamed "the first city on the Missouri River", Townsend sits nearby the southern tip of Canyon Ferry Lake (a part of, and fed by, the Missouri River) a popular recreation destination and Montana's third largest body of water.

Demographics

2010 census
As of the census of 2010, there were 1,878 people, 822 households, and 495 families residing in the city. The racial makeup of the city was 95.5% White, 0.2% African American, 1.5% Native American, 0.3% Asian, 0.7% from other races, and 1.8% from two or more races. Hispanic or Latino of any race were 2.8% of the population.

There were 822 households, of which 25.8% had children under the age of 18 living with them, 47.9% were married couples living together, 7.9% had a female householder with no husband present, 4.4% had a male householder with no wife present, and 39.8% were non-families. 35.4% of all households were made up of individuals, and 16.5% had someone living alone who was 65 years of age or older. The average household size was 2.22 and the average family size was 2.85.

The median age in the city was 45.7 years. 22% of residents were under the age of 18; 7.6% were between the ages of 18 and 24; 19.5% were from 25 to 44; 28.2% were from 45 to 64; and 22.8% were 65 years of age or older. The gender makeup of the city was 51.1% male and 48.9% female.

2000 census
As of the census of 2000, there were 1,867 people, 786 households, and 507 families residing in the city. The population density was 1,176.2 people per square mile (453.4/km). There were 847 housing units at an average density of 533.6 per square mile (205.7/km). The racial makeup of the city was 97.59% White, 0.11% African American, 1.39% Native American, 0.43% from other races, and 0.48% from two or more races. Hispanic or Latino of any race were 1.77% of the population.

There were 786 households, out of which 26.6% had children under the age of 18 living with them, 52.2% were married couples living together, 8.1% had a female householder with no husband present, and 35.4% were non-families. 32.2% of all households were made up of individuals, and 16.5% had someone living alone who was 65 years of age or older. The average household size was 2.32 and the average family size was 2.89.

In the city, the population was spread out, with 23.7% under the age of 18, 6.5% from 18 to 24, 23.7% from 25 to 44, 23.5% from 45 to 64, and 22.5% who were 65 years of age or older. The median age was 43 years. For every 100 females, there were 100.1 males. For every 100 females age 18 and over, there were 100.6 males.

The median income for a household in the city was $26,820, and the median income for a family was $32,679. Males had a median income of $26,859 versus $19,375 for females. The per capita income for the city was $13,674. About 10.1% of families and 13.2% of the population were below the poverty line, including 19.5% of those under age 18 and 9.6% of those age 65 or over.

Climate
Townsend experiences a semi-arid climate (Köppen BSk) with cold, dry winters and hot, wetter summers.

Infrastructure
Townsend Airport is a public use airport located 2 miles east of town.

Education
Townsend School District educates students from kindergarten to 12th grade. The mascot for Broadwater High School is the Bulldogs.

Broadwater Community Library is located in Townsend.

Notable people
 Ben Clopton - cartoon artist
 Patrick Duffy - actor who played Bobby Ewing in Dallas and was also in Step By Step, was born in Townsend
 Esther Reed - identity thief, was born in Townsend

References

Cities in Broadwater County, Montana
County seats in Montana
Montana populated places on the Missouri River
Populated places established in 1883
1883 establishments in Montana Territory
Cities in Montana